Super Dinosaur is a CG-animated television series produced by Spin Master Entertainment, Atomic Cartoons and Skybound Entertainment based on the comic book series of the same name by Robert Kirkman and Jason Howard. The show debuted on September 8, 2018 in Canada on Teletoon and in the United States on the Amazon Prime subscription streaming video service on October 6, 2019. It was subsequently added to Tubi and The Roku Channel.

Characters

Heroes
 Derek Dynamo (voiced by Valin Shinyei) - The fun-loving, highly intelligent and energetic son of Dr. Dexter Dynamo. Alongside his father and best friend Super Dinosaur, Derek works for Earthcore, protecting the planet from various hazards. He rides around on Wheels, a robot he built.
 Super Dinosaur (voiced by Deven Mack) - A genetically-altered Tyrannosaurus rex created by Max Maximus, Super Dinosaur lives with the Dynamo family in the Dynamo Dome and is the best friend of Derek, who often refers to him as "SD". He is a vegetarian, and he loves to play video games and ride skateboards. In battle, he uses an interchangeable harness with robotic arms. He accidentally adopted a penguin as a pet on a mission.
 Dr. Dexter Dynamo (voiced by Alessandro Juliani) - Derek's father, a genius who helps create the gear his son and Super Dinosaur use on their missions. His cognitive abilities are diminished after Max Maximus poisons him with a mind-decaying virus though this was later reversed by an invention of Dr Dynamo's old friend Dr Oliver Manchester in the season 1 finale.
 The Kingstons - A family of mechanics sent to live in the Dynamo Dome by General Casey; responsible for building and repairing Derek and Super Dinosaur's combat equipment
Bruce Kingston (voiced by Brian Dobson) - The husband of Sarah, and father of Erin and Erica
Sarah Kingston (voiced by Kathleen Barr) - The wife of Bruce, and mother of Erin and Erica
Erin Kingston (voiced by Shannon Chan-Kent) -  A charismatic and curious girl who makes quick friends with Derek upon the Kingston's arrival to the Dynamo Dome. She is fascinated by all the amazing technology created by Doctor Dynamo and Derek and responds to her family's move much more positively than her sister. Derek builds her Pixie, a robot similar to Wheels and joins Earthcore's cadet program.
Erica Kingston (voiced by Shannon Chan-Kent) - Annoyed about moving from Washington D.C., she is initially far less receptive to the Dynamos than her sister. She has a pet spider named Sherman. Unlike her sister, Erica cares little about Earthcore and is more drawn to the arts.
 General Casey (voiced by Dean Redman) - The Earthcore military administrator to the Dynamos and their super-heroic activities; oversees the majority of their funding, deployment into combat situations, and imprisonment of defeated super-villains at Earthcore Headquarters.
 Elliot Casey (voiced by Tevon Herbert) - General Casey's son, who is around Derek's age; he is shown to be impulsive and pulls a dangerous prank on the Dynamo Dome to get his father's attention. He uses multiple aliases throughout the series (one of them being Battle Shock which includes using a giant mech) and eventually is allowed to join the Earthcore cadet training program. He later helps capture Terropterx although he ends up being captured by him and partially transformed into a Dino-Men

Villains

 Max Maximus (voiced by Marco Soriano) - An evil scientist who created Dynore, an incredibly powerful energy source. He seeks to destroy the Dynamos and take control of the world. He commands an army of genetically-engineered Dino-Men from his lair, Castle Maximus.
 Minimus (voiced by Sean Thomas) - The artificial "son" of Maximus who was created via cloning, and initially pretended to be friendly to gain Derek's Trust under the alias of Tom Tillred. He became leader of the Dino-Men upon his "father's" incarceration, and later wrests control of the Sharkmen from Squidious. However close to the season 1 finale when Max Maximus returns to power he is transformed into a half human half dinosaur form named Tyrannosaurus X (voiced by Andrew Francis).
 Dino-Men (voiced by various) - Maximus' army of genetically-engineered human/dinosaur hybrids. While most are little more than subservient, dimwitted henchmen, there are a few who are highly intelligent, as detailed below.
 Tricerachops (voiced by Kathleen Barr) - A female Triceratops who wields a battle-axe. She is Maximus' most favored servant and is shown to be more empathetic than other Dino-Men. After her morals are tested, she defects from Maximus' army and forms the Dino Liberation Front.
 Dreadasaurus (voiced by Chris Nielsen) - A Stegosaurus with a shield that shoots spikes. Like Tricerachops, he defected from Maximus' army, and now serves under her in the Dino Liberation Front.
 Terroropterx (voiced by Bart Batchelor) - A pterodactyl with shoulder-mounted weaponry and dual sabers. Like Tricerachops, he defected from Maximus' army, and now serves under her in the Dino Liberation Front. He attempted to get some mutated dinosaur DNA to create a new Dino-Men army but was captured by Earth Core. Although he later breaks out and takes Eliot Casey hostage
 Doometrodon (voiced by Brian Drummond) - A Dimetrodon with a cybernetic right arm that can be used as a morning star as well as a blaster. Like Tricerachops, he defected from Maximus' army, and now serves under her in the Dino Liberation Front.
 Squidious (voiced by Brian Drummond) - A super-intelligent giant squid who is angered at humans' use of the sea's resources. He leads an army of Sharkmen to do his bidding to protect their underwater domain with his mobile base, a megalodon known as the Lair Leviathan.
 KAL (voiced by Vincent Tong) - An Earthcore robot meant to assist Derek and Super Dinosaur on their missions. He views himself as a rival to Super Dinosaur for the status of Derek's best friend, often berating the rex by calling him "Average Dinosaur". On their first mission together, KAL becomes engulfed in lava, transforming him into the villainous Erupticus.
 Megaraptor - Maximus most powerful creation. A giant raptor with a giant fin-like blade on top of its head and a fish-like tail.

Production

An animated adaptation of Super Dinosaur was first revealed by KidScreen on November 22, 2017, as a production between Spin Master Entertainment, Atomic Cartoons and Canadian broadcaster Corus Entertainment. The series was formally announced by Robert Kirkman at the Skybound Entertainment panel during the 2018 San Diego Comic-Con. At the company's fall 2018 upfronts, Corus confirmed that the show would air on Teletoon later that year. The series debuted on the channel on September 8.

Super Dinosaur is primarily a CG-animated series made with Autodesk Maya. The show also utilizes super deformed 2D-animation for cutaway gags and is presented in a letter boxed aspect ratio with matte break effects to emphasize action and comedy.

Episodes

Mobile game

On October 24, 2018, Canadian mobile development studio Big Blue Bubble released Super Dinosaur: Kickin' Tail, a battle game featuring characters and locations from the TV series. It was first soft launched in Canada as a free-to-play title for iOS and Android devices.

International broadcast

The series debuted in Australia on ABC Me on May 18, 2019. In New Zealand, it began airing on TVNZ 2 on June 22, 2019. In the United States, the series was released on Amazon Prime Video on October 6, 2019. It was later added to Tubi TV in February 2020.

References

External links
 

Teletoon original programming
2019 American television series debuts
2019 American television series endings
2010s American animated television series
2010s American comedy-drama television series
2010s American comic science fiction television series
2018 Canadian television series debuts
2019 Canadian television series endings
2010s Canadian animated television series
2010s Canadian comedy-drama television series
2010s Canadian comic science fiction television series
American children's animated action television series
American children's animated adventure television series
American children's animated comic science fiction television series
American children's animated drama television series
American children's animated science fantasy television series
American computer-animated television series
Canadian children's animated action television series
Canadian children's animated adventure television series
Canadian children's animated comic science fiction television series
Canadian children's animated drama television series
Canadian children's animated science fantasy television series
Canadian computer-animated television series
English-language television shows
Television shows based on comics
Animated television series about children
Animated television series about dinosaurs
Television series based on Image Comics